Masvingo South is a constituency represented in the National Assembly of the Parliament of Zimbabwe. Created for the 1985 election, its territory is an area south of central Masvingo, in Masvingo Province in southeastern Zimbabwe. Its inaugural member, Eddison Zvobgo of ZANU–PF, held the seat for 19 years until his death in 2004. The current MP since the 2018 election is Claudious Maronge of ZANU–PF.

History 
Eddison Zvobgo, one of the ZANU–PF founders, was the Member of Parliament (MP) for Masvingo South from its creation in 1985 until his death in 2004. In a by-election held on 11 October 2004, the ZANU–PF candidate Walter Mzembi was elected unopposed after the opposition Movement for Democratic Change did not put forth a candidate. Mzembi was reelected in the 2005, 2008, and 2013 elections. In 2018, ZANU–PF's Claudious Maronge was elected to represent Masvingo South.

Members

References 

1985 establishments in Zimbabwe
Constituencies established in 1985
Masvingo District
Masvingo Province
Parliamentary constituencies in Zimbabwe